BK Iskra Svit is a Slovak professional basketball club that is based in Svit, Slovakia. The club competes in the Slovak Extraliga. The club's full name is Basketbalový Klub Iskra Svit. The club was previously known as BK Chemosvit.

Current squad

Honours
Czechoslovak League
Champions (1): 1961
Slovak Extraliga
Champions (1): 2003
Slovak Cup
Winners (5): 1998, 2001, 2004, 2005, 2014

Notable players

External links
Official Website 
Eurobasket.com Team Page

Basketball teams established in 1947
Basketball teams in Slovakia
Sport in Prešov Region
1947 establishments in Czechoslovakia
Basketball in Czechoslovakia